Funck is a surname of Germanic origin. Around the time that monarchies were common, the Funck family was of nobility. This is a somewhat rare last name. 

Notable people with this last name include:
Emma Maddox Funck (1853 - 1940), American suffragist
Eva Funck (born 1956), Swedish TV host
Frantz Funck-Brentano (1862–1947), Luxembourgian-French historian; son of Théodore Funck-Brentano
Frederik Christian Funck (1783–1866), Danish cellist and composer
Hans Freiherr von Funck (1891–1979), German army general during World War II
Heinrich Christian Funck (1771–1839), German pharmacist and bryologist
Peter Ferdinand Funck (1788–1859), Danish violinist and composer
Théodore Funck-Brentano (1830–1906), Luxembourgian-French sociologist; father of Frantz Funck-Brentano
Thomas Funck (1919–2010), Swedish nobleman, author, and radio personality

Germanic-language surnames